The Higher Education Loan Authority of the State of Missouri, aka the Missouri Higher Education Loan Authority or MOHELA, is one of the largest holders and servicers of student loans in the United States. Its headquarters are in St. Louis, Missouri. 

MOHELA is among the ten largest student loan servicers.

Created in 1981 as a quasi-governmental entity, MOHELA participated in the Federal Family Education Loan Program (FFELP) for nearly three decades.

Student loan transfer controversy 

Several complaints from borrowers have been made about loan-handling during and after the switch to MOHELA, with their complaining of charges for late payments due to delayed processing of those made to the Department of Education before the transfer, suspension of auto-payment programs, increased payment amounts, lengthened estimated repayment-dates, changes to the borrower's selected repayment plan, unwanted forbearances and deferments, failure to process forms, and applied or capitalized interest.

MOHELA does not provide a means for borrowers to contact the agency via email or chat, and neither does it have any public social media outlets; the only means for communication are a single telephone number and a postal address.

MOHELA has a 1.01 star rating from the Better Business Bureau MOHELA is currently involved in legal efforts to block US President Biden's student loan forgiveness executive order.

Types of student loans owned and serviced by MOHELA

These include:

 Federal subsidized and unsubsidized (private) Stafford loans
 Federal Perkins loans
 PLUS loans
 Federal GradPLUS loans
 Federal student loan consolidation

See funding of higher education in the United States for general information on the topic.

References

External links 
 MOHELA
 Missouri Department of Higher Education
 Missouri Higher Education Loan Authority recipient profile on USAspending.gov
 Contract ED-FSA-11-D-0012 on USAspending.gov

United States federal student loan servicers
Education in Missouri
1981 establishments in Missouri
Education finance in the United States